KFC Komárno is a Slovak football club in the town of Komárno. The club was founded on 29 April 1900 in Komárom, Kingdom of Hungary in the main hall of the town hall of Komárno by the initialization of András Beliczay. The team's colours are purple and white. The motto of the team is "Kedv, Kitartás, Küzdelem", this is represented in the logo as K.K.K., translation from Hungarian to English: Spriti, Endurance, Fight.

History
The team was founded in 1900, 29 May as Komáromi Labdarúgó Társaság. After two years, in 1902 they adopted the name Komáromi Football Club (KFC). The historical KFC first match played on 29 July 1900 against Budapest Kistétény, the team lost 0–5, after half 0–1. The club is focused on the education of young talented players. Agile KFC club director Gyula Höltzl, so in 1904 organized the first ever football students match to the territory of the present Slovakia.
One of the most successful pupil was Szilárd Németh former Slovak second highest topscorer (22 goals) of all time, second only to Róbert Vittek with (23 goals). It is the oldest still active football club in the present territory of Slovakia, the two oldest are already dissolved, the Pozsonyi Torna Egylet, dissolved in 1945 and the Eperjesi Torna és Vívó Egylet dissolved in 1945, due to Beneš decrees and the expulsions of Hungarians from Czechoslovakia.

Supporters
KFC Komárno supporters are called Gruppo Porcaccioni.

Current squad
As of 5 March 2023

For recent transfers, see List of Slovak football transfers winter 2022–23.

Notable players
The following players had won international caps for their respective countries' senior national team. 
Players whose name is listed in bold represented their countries while playing for KFC.

Managers 

 Peter Lérant (2011)
 Mikuláš Radványi (2012)
 Peter Lérant (2016)
 Richard Matovič (2016–2017)
 Peter Zelenský (2017–2018)
 Jozef Olejník (2018–2019)
 István Szijjártó (careteker) (2019)
 Miroslav Karhan (2019–2020)
 István Szijjártó (careteker) (2020)
 Szilárd Németh (2020–2021)
 Mikuláš Radványi (2021–)
 Danny Crossley (2023-)

References

External links
Official website 
Official website 
Unofficial website 
 

Football clubs in Slovakia
Association football clubs established in 1900
1900 establishments in Hungary
Komárno